Sergey Turanok (born 23 March 1986) is a Belarusian professional footballer who plays for Yedinstvo Dzerzhinsk.

References

External links
 
 

1986 births
Living people
Belarusian footballers
Association football goalkeepers
FC Livadiya Dzerzhinsk players
FC Torpedo Minsk players
FC Kommunalnik Slonim players
FC Torpedo-BelAZ Zhodino players
FC Gorodeya players
FC Khimik Svetlogorsk players
FC Isloch Minsk Raion players
FC Belshina Bobruisk players
FC Molodechno players